= Carlos Cirne Lima =

Brazilian philosopher

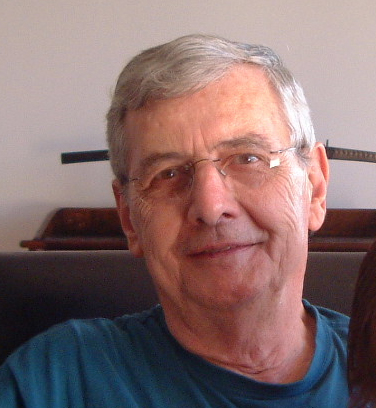

Carlos Roberto Velho Cirne Lima (1 June 1931 – 1 July 2020), also referred to as Carlos Cirne Lima, was a Brazilian contemporary dialectical philosopher.

== Biography ==
Carlos Roberto Velho Cirne Lima was born on 1 June 1931 in Porto Alegre, Rio Grande do Sul, Brazil. He obtained his doctor-degree in 1958 at the University of Innsbruck, Austria.

Lima a full professor at the universities UFRGS (Universidade Federal do Rio Grande do Sul), PUCRS (Pontífica Universidade do Rio Grande do Sul) in Porto Alegre, and UNISINOS in São Leopoldo, Rio Grande do Sul.

Lima died on 1 July 2020, at the age of 89.

== Books in English ==
- CIRNE-LIMA, CARLOS Personal Faith: A Metaphysical Inquiry, Herder, 1965. 206 pp.
- Cirne-Lima, Carlos Dialectics for Beginners, PUCRS, 1997
- Cirne-Lima, Carlos Beyond Hegel, Editora da Universidade de Caxias do Sul / RS

== Books in Portuguese ==
- Depois de Hegel. Uma reconstrução crítica do sistema neoplatônico (2006)
- Dialética e auto-organização (2003, organizador, com Luiz Rohden)
- Nós e o Absoluto (2001, organizador, com R. C. Costa e C. Almeida)
- Dialética para Todos (2005) [CD Rom] feito em parceria com Alípio Lippstein, Maurício N.Santos, Carlos Dohrn e Maria Tomaselli
- Dialética para Principiantes (1996)
- Sobre a contradição (1993)
- Realismo e Dialética. A Analogia como dialética do Realismo (1967)

== Book in German ==
- Der personale Glaube. Eine erkenntnismetaphysische Studie (1959)
